Árva County was an administrative county (comitatus) of the Kingdom of Hungary since the 14th century until 1920. Its territory is now in northern Slovakia and southern Poland. Today, the Slovak name is only used as an informal designation of the corresponding territory (see Orava region).

Geography

Between 1804-1854 and 1860-1920, Árva County shared borders with Austrian Galicia and the Hungarian counties of Trencsén, Turóc and Liptó County. The county's territory was situated along the Árva (Orava) river between Zázriva (Zázrivá) and the Tatra mountains. Its area was 2,019 km² around 1910. Now the territory is divided between Poland and Slovakia. The main Polish town of Orava is Jabłonka.

Capitals
The county seat was at the Orava Castle (Hungarian: Árva vára). After the destruction of the town by the Lithuanian troops in 1683, the seat was moved to Alsókubin (also Kolbin, Kublen, Kubin, Also Helben, Clbin, Culbyn, Cublyn, present-day Dolný Kubín).

History
Emerging from the Zólyom royal land, the first written mention about Árva County is from 1349. However, the territory had been still referenced as a district in 1351-1368 and it finally became a county with its own self-administration in 1370.

In the aftermath of World War I, the territory of the whole county became part of newly formed Czechoslovakia. After a border dispute (treated in detail under Polish–Czechoslovak border conflicts) several villages in the north-east territory were exchanged between Poland and Czechoslovakia. The former county's Czechoslovak part was abolished with effective date 1 January 1923 and its territory became a part of Váh County.

Demographics

Districts

In the early 20th century, the districts and their capitals were:

Notes

References

External links
  http://www.orava.sk
  http://skansen.nowotarski.pl Orawa Ethnographic Park
 http://www.oravafoto.com
  http://www.namestovo-orava.webnode.sk

States and territories established in 1860
States and territories disestablished in 1854
States and territories disestablished in 1920
Counties in the Kingdom of Hungary
Divided regions